Antonio Ambu (born 10 May 1936) is an Italian former long-distance runner who competed in the 1964 Summer Olympics and in the 1968 Summer Olympics.

National titles
Antonio Ambu has won 34 times the individual national championship.
6 wins on 5000 metres (1958, 1961, 1962, 1964, 1965, 1967)
7 wins on 10000 metres (1958, 1962, 1964, 1965, 1966, 1967, 1968)
7 wins on Half marathon (1961, 1962, 1964, 1965, 1966, 1967, 1968)
7 wins on Marathon (1962, 1964, 1965, 1966, 1967, 1968, 1969)
7 wins on Cross country running (1959, 1963, 1964, 1966, 1967, 1968, 1969)

See also
 Men's marathon Italian record progression
 Italian Athletics Championships - Multi winners
 5000 metres winners of Italian Athletics Championships
 10000 metres winners of Italian Athletics Championships

References

External links
 

1936 births
Living people
Sportspeople from Cagliari
Italian male cross country runners
Italian male long-distance runners
Italian male marathon runners
Olympic athletes of Italy
Athletes (track and field) at the 1964 Summer Olympics
Athletes (track and field) at the 1968 Summer Olympics
Mediterranean Games gold medalists for Italy
Athletes (track and field) at the 1967 Mediterranean Games
Mediterranean Games medalists in athletics
Italian Athletics Championships winners